Bruce Reitherman (born September 15, 1955) is an American filmmaker and former child actor. He voiced Christopher Robin in Winnie the Pooh and the Honey Tree and Mowgli in The Jungle Book.

Early life and work 
Born in Burbank, California, Reitherman is the son of German-American Disney animator Wolfgang Reitherman and Janie Marie McMillan, and provided the voices of Mowgli in The Jungle Book and Christopher Robin in Winnie the Pooh and the Honey Tree. 

He graduated U.C. Berkeley in 1977 with an independent major in natural resources and a minor in Spanish.

Career
After graduating Berkeley, he had stints as a river guide, field biologist, naturalist, expedition leader and biological consultant.  He has worked on natural history productions in exotic locations from Alaska to Australia. Starting out as a freelance cameraman in 1983, Reitherman has gone on to produce documentaries broadcast by PBS, National Geographic Television, The Discovery Channel, the BBC and Canal Plus. He served as cameraman, producer, writer and director, in the 1990s in shows like In the Wild, Nature, and  Big Bear Week.

Reitherman was also part of a Members Only Preview for the behind-the-scenes exhibition titled Walt Disney’s The Jungle Book: Making a Masterpiece during a special talk alongside Andreas Deja, Darleen Carr and Floyd Norman which took place on June 22, 2022. The exhibition took place at The Walt Disney Family Museum from June 23, 2022 to January 8, 2023.

Personal life
He lives in Santa Barbara, California with his wife, artist Erika Hill, and their daughter.

Filmography

Film 
 Winnie the Pooh and the Honey Tree (1966) (voice of Christopher Robin)
 The Jungle Book (1967) (voice of Mowgli the Man Cub)
 The Many Adventures of Winnie the Pooh (1977) (voice of Christopher Robin in the segment of Winnie the Pooh and the Honey Tree)
 Big Bear Week (2006) (5 episodes)
 Out from Boneville (2004) (voice of Rat Creatures)

Director, writer, producer
 Nature (1982) TV Series (episode "The Living Edens: Big Sur - California's Wild Coast")
 In the Wild (1995) TV Series (episode " Whales with Christopher Reeve")
 The Living Edens (1997) TV Series (episodes " Big Sur: California's Wild Coast (2002),Thailand: Jewel of the Orient (1999),Denali: Alaska's Great Wilderness (1997)") 
 New True Life Adventures: Alaska: Dances of the Caribou (2000) TV Movie

References

External links

Picture of young Bruce with his father during the production of The Jungle Book

1955 births
Living people
20th-century American male actors
21st-century American male actors
American male child actors
American male voice actors
American people of German descent
American television directors
Male actors from Burbank, California
Musicians from Burbank, California
University of California, Berkeley alumni